Tourism in New Zealand comprised an important sector of the national economy – tourism directly contributed NZ$16.2 billion (or 5.8%) of the country's GDP in the year ended March 2019.  tourism supported 188,000 full-time-equivalent jobs (nearly 7.5% of New Zealand's workforce). The flow-on effects of tourism indirectly contributed a further 4.3% of GDP (or NZ$9.8 billion). Despite the country's geographical isolation, spending by international tourists accounted for 17.1% of New Zealand's export earnings (nearly NZ$12 billion). International and domestic tourism contributed, in total, NZ$34 billion to New Zealand's economy every year .

New Zealand markets itself abroad as a "clean, green" adventure-playground (Tourism New Zealand's main marketing slogan, "100% Pure New Zealand", reflects this), emphasising as typical tourist destinations  nature areas such as Milford Sound, Abel Tasman National Park and the Tongariro Alpine Crossing; while activities such as bungee jumping or whale watching exemplify typical tourist attractions, marketed primarily to individual and small-group travellers.  Australia provides by far the largest group of New Zealand's international tourists (about 45%), due to its close proximity (three to four hours by plane) and traditional good relations. Mainland China, the United States and the United Kingdom are the next three largest markets.

The vast majority of international tourist arrivals to New Zealand come through Auckland Airport, which handled 11.5 million international passengers . Two percent of visitors arrived by sea . Many international tourists spend time in Auckland, Christchurch, Queenstown, Rotorua, and Wellington. Other high-profile destinations include the Bay of Islands, the Waitomo Caves, Aoraki / Mount Cook, and Milford Sound. Many tourists travel considerable distances through the country during their stays, typically using coach lines or hired cars. Though some destinations have seasonal specialities (for winter sports, for example), New Zealand's southern-hemisphere location offers attractions for off-peak northern-hemisphere tourists chasing or avoiding certain seasons. In June 2018 the New Zealand government announced the imposition of a "tourist tax" of around NZ$25 to NZ$35 for international visitors, excluding Australians, many Pacific islanders, and young children. It planned to implement this taxation in 2019 through a newly proposed electronic travel-registration process.

The interaction of the demands of international tourism and aspects of New Zealand's self-perceived national character (such as individualism and classless egalitarianism)
can entail contradictions.

International travel

Overview 

The country is internationally seen as a top holiday destination, as shown by being voted most favourite destination by the readers of the Condé Nast Traveler magazine (specialising in luxury travel) in 2008, though it slipped to second place in 2009. A 2007 Daily Telegraph poll, the United Kingdom's largest such poll,  also identified New Zealand as the best overseas holiday destination. Between 2000 (the start of an advertising campaign by Tourism New Zealand) and 2007 the number of Britons visiting New Zealand increased by  61%. In November 2012 readers of the UK newspaper The Telegraph voted New Zealand the best country in the world to go to on holiday.

The availability of air travel is a large contributing factor to market growth. After Air New Zealand launched non-stop flights from Auckland to Buenos Aires in December 2015, visitor numbers from Argentina tripled, from 5,400 in 2015 to 15,300 in 2016.

Tourism New Zealand, the country's official tourism agency, actively promotes the country as a destination worldwide. Activities have included a NZ$7 million campaign in China, concentrating on Shanghai, and co-operating to produce a New Zealand tourism layer for Google Earth, the first such country-wide initiative.

Visitors from 60 countries require a New Zealand eTA (NZ eTA) from 1 October 2019.

From March 2020 the New Zealand government implemented strict quarantine provisions to prevent the spread of COVID-19, and the numbers of incoming international visitors dropped dramatically. The tourism sector responded with a strategy of hunker and hope.
A brief re-opening of borders with Australia (the "travel bubble") from April 2021 encountered official "pauses" and "suspension" (July 2021) as the COVID-19 Delta variant took hold in different Australian states.

Environmental impacts 
Public concern over the environmental impacts of air travel may threaten tourism growth in New Zealand, as almost all tourists fly long distances to reach New Zealand. However, Ministry of Tourism data in 2007 predicted a four percent annual growth in tourist numbers in New Zealand, with 3.2 million tourists annually to be reached in 2014. However, it remains unclear how New Zealand's carbon-neutral policy will affect future tourism – with some researchers arguing that the carbon emissions of tourism are much higher than generally considered, that their offsetting or mitigation will be very difficult, and that this poses a serious threat to the country's major source of foreign income.

Domestic travel 

Periodic campaigns are also directed at New Zealanders, urging them to travel within New Zealand instead of overseas, due to a perception by the tourism industry that too many New Zealanders are travelling to Australia or other countries instead of domestically. Perhaps the best-known slogan is "Don't leave town until you've seen the country".

Air travel is a popular way of getting around the country due to the lack of transport alternatives over longer distances (for example, going from Auckland to Napier, a 400 km journey takes an hour by plane compared to nearly five hours by car or seven hours by bus.

Passenger trains are limited to Auckland-Wellington, Picton-Christchurch and Christchurch-Greymouth, scenic daytrip journeys which often cost more than an airfare. Outside of trunk routes connecting main cities (Auckland, Wellington, Christchurch, Dunedin, Queenstown), airfares can, due to a lack of competition, cost nearly as much as trips to Australia.

Domestic tourism contributed NZ$14 billion to New Zealand's economy (as of the year ended March 2013). 31 million day trips and 16.6 million overnight trips were made in the year ended December 2012, a decline of 4% and 6% respectively. However, total spending stayed static, with a 2% decline in day trip spending (now at $3.7 billion) offset by a 1% increase in overnight spending (currently NZ$6.2 billion).

Domestic tourism spending still exceeds that of international tourism; in the year to March 2020, domestic tourists spent $24.4 billion compared to $17.5 billion spent by international tourists. However, the economy suffered from COVID-19 pandemic, when the borders were closed to the international tourists and other visitors from 2020 to 2022, and the tourism sector is expected to take years to recover.

Tourist activities 

Popular tourist activities in New Zealand include sightseeing, adventure tourism, tramping (hiking) and camping. To support active travel, New Zealand has numerous walking and hiking paths (often created and maintained by the DOC), some of which, like the Milford Track, have huge international recognition. There is also a walking route the length of the country (Te Araroa) and the New Zealand Cycle Trail.

Statistics

International markets 
The top countries for international visitor arrivals to New Zealand in terms of their nationality are as follows.

Australia accounted for 57.8 percent of New Zealand visitor arrivals in 2022. Broken down by state, New South Wales accounted for 272,879 visitors, followed by Queensland with 210,131 visitors, and Victoria with 193,912 visitors.

Of the top 14 nationalities, all except India, China, Fiji and Samoa are entitled to visa waivers, while all except the United Kingdom, Germany, and India have non-stop flights to New Zealand.

See also 
 Visa policy of New Zealand
 Tourism New Zealand, official tourism agency
 Tolkien tourism, on the effects of The Lord of the Rings films
 List of museums in New Zealand
 List of World Heritage Sites in New Zealand

References

External links 

 New Zealand Government – Ministry for Tourism

 
New Zealand